The Panchala (पञ्चाल Pañcāla) kingdom was one of the historical Mahajanapadas of ancient India (c. 30th to 4th centuries BC). It was annexed into the Nanda Empire during the reign of Mahapadma Nanda. Ahichchhatra was capital of northern Panchala and Kampilya was capital of southern Panchala.

Panchala in the Mahabharata

Geography 
The Panchala kingdom (Mahabharata) extends from the Himalayas in the north; to the Charmanwati river; with the Kuru, Surasena and Matsya kingdoms to the west; and the Naimisha Forest to the east. Later, Panchala was divided into Southern Panchala ("Panchala proper", centered at Kampilya, ruled by King Drupada, the father-in-law of Pandavas); and Northern Panchala (centered at Ahichatra, ruled by Ashwathama, the son of Drona. Drona was Drupada's friend who later became his enemy). The Ganges River separated the two Panchalas.

People from Panchala

In Mahabharata many figures were said to be natives of Panchala.

 Draupadi or Panchali : Wife of the Pandavas

 Dhrishtadyumna : Commander-in-Chief of the Pandavas in Kurukshetra War and brother of Panchali

 Drupada : Father of Panchali and Dhristadyumna

 Shikhandi or Sikhandin : Another daughter of Drupada (He married from Dasarna (See Dasarna Kingdom)

 Prishata : Father of Drupada.

 Satyajit : Commander-in-chief of Panchala army under king Drupada and second oldest son, alternately called Chitraratha in Mahabharata.

 Sage Dhaumya : Priest of the Pandavas.

 Aruni : A Brahmin boy from Panchala and disciple of sage Dhaumya.

Many other sons of Drupada (a total of 10) and other Panchala princes (like Yudhamanyu, Uttamaujas, Janamejaya etc.) were allied with the Pandavas in the Kurukshetra War.

Origin of Panchala Kingdom 
The lineage extending from King Puru, son of King Yayati to Santanu. The following passage from Mahabharata, that describes the Puru lineage of kings, shows the kinship of the Kurus and the Panchalas, both branched from the same line: "When Janamejaya wished to hear the history of kings who were descended from Puru. Vaisampayana narrated the lineage of kings in Puru’s line.".

Lineage of the Puru Kings up to the Panchala Kingdom 

Puru had by his wife, Paushti, three sons: Pravira, Iswara, and Raudraswa.

Pravira (perpetuator of the dynasty) had by his wife, Suraseni, a son Manasyu. Manasyu had by his wife, Sauviri, three sons: Sakta, Sahana, and Vagmi.

Raudraswa had by his wife, Apsara Misrakesi, ten sons (all who had sons): Richeyu, Kaksreyu, Vrikeyu, Sthandileyu, Vaneyu, Jaleyu, Tejeyu, Satyeyu, Dharmeyu and Sannateyu.

Richeyu, as Anadhrishti, succeeded them all. Anadhristi had a son, Matinara, the latter who was well-regarded and virtuous as king and performed the Rajasuya and the Ashwamedha. Matinara had four sons: Tansu, Mahan, Atiratha, and Druhyu.

Tansu (perpetuator of the Puru line) had a son, Ilina.

Ilina had by his wife, Rathantara, five sons: Dushyanta, Sura, Bhima, Pravasu, and Vasu; Dushyanta succeeded as king.

Dushyanta had by his wife, Sakuntala, an intelligent son who succeeded as Emperor Bharata. It is the name of the latter that is applied to the race of which he was the founder.

Bharata had with his three wives nine sons but he was not pleased with any of them. Bharata performed a great sacrifice and through the grace of Bharadwaja obtained a son, Bhumanyu, who was made his heir-apparent.

Bhumanyu had by his wife: Pushkarini, six sons: Suhotra, Suhotri, Suhavih, Sujeya, Diviratha and Kichika.

Suhotra, described as having a virtuous reign, had by his wife, Aikshaki, three sons: Ajamidha, Sumidha, and Purumidha. Ajamidha succeeded them all.

Ajamidha's son was Nila. The dynasty of Ajamidha stands as:

Nila
Susanti
Purujanu
Rksa
Bhrmyasva
Mudgala
Vadhryasva
Divodasa
Mitrayu
Maitreya Soma
Srnjaya
Cyavana Pancajana
Sudasa Somadatta
Sahadeva
Somaka
Jantu
Prsata
Drupada

War between Panchalas and the forefathers of Kurus 

The outcome of warring between the Kurus and Panchalas led the Kurus being exiled to the banks of the Sindhu.

Riksha became king being the elder of Jala and Rupina. Riksha had a son, Samvarana, the latter the perpetrator of the royal line.

During the reign of Samvarana, there was a great loss of people by famine, pestilence, drought, and disease.

The king of the Panchalas invaded during this time with four kinds of troops and ten Akshauhinis. Samvarana was exiled with his family and government in the forest along the Sindhu or Tapati river, the latter which extended to the foot of the western mountains. There the Bharatas lived for a thousand years.

Samvarana had with his wife, Tapati (?) (the daughter of Surya, a king of the Solar Dynasty), a son Kuru.

Then one day the sage Vasishtha, having become the priest, approached the exiled Bharata and made him the sovereign of the Kshatriyas. The king retook his old capital made all the monarchs pay tribute to him.

Kuru was exceedingly virtuous, and was made king by his people, the founding of the Kuru dynasty and the Kuru Kingdom. The field called Kurujangala is named after him and is where after becoming devoted to asceticism, he there practiced asceticism.

The sages in the line of Vasistha, were the priests of the Solar Dynasty of kings for many generations, especially the Ikshwakus. It is speculated that is why Samvarana took Vasistha as his priest, married from the Solar Dynasty. The history of Samvarana falling in love with Tapati while he lived near the Tapati river) was with the help of Maharashtra and Vasistha in getting the consent to marry from her father king Surya

Drupada becomes the king of Panchala 

The King Prishata of Northern Panchala, a great friend of Bharadwaja, had a son, named Drupada. Drupada would come every day to the hermitage of Bharadwaja to play and study with Drona. Prishata died, Drupada succeeded him as the king and then repudiated his friendship with Drona. Drupada insulted Drona by saying that Drona was not a king, but a poor Brahmana.

Partition of the Panchala Kingdom 

Drona defeated Drupada, by means of his disciple Arjuna and the other Kuru princes, to settle his old scores. Drona spoke as follows to the captive Drupada:-

Thou toldest me before that none who was not a king could be a king’s friend. Therefore is it, O Yajnasena (Drupada), that I retain half thy kingdom. Thou art the king of all the territory lying on the southern side of the Bhagirathi (Ganga), while I become king of all the territory on the north of that river. And, O Panchala, if it pleaseth thee, know me hence for thy friend.

On hearing these words, Drupada answered: Thou art of noble soul and great prowess. Therefore, O Brahmana, I am not surprised at what thou doest. I am very much gratified with thee, and I desire thy eternal friendship.

After this, Drona released the king of Panchala, and cheerfully performing the usual offices of regard, bestowed upon him half the kingdom. Thenceforth Drupada began to reside sorrowfully in the city of Kampilya within the province of Makandi on the banks of the Ganges filled with many towns and cities. And after his defeat by Drona, Drupada ruled the Southern Panchalas up to the bank of the Charmanwati river. Meanwhile Drona continued to reside in Ahichatra. Thus was the territory of Ahicchatra full of towns and cities, obtained by Arjuna, and bestowed upon Drona.

Higher status of Panchalas and Kurus in ancient India 

The Kurus and Panchalas were considered as foremost among the ruling tribes in ancient India, because they followed the Vedic religion in its dogmatic and purest form. Other tribes imitated the practices of these tribes and thus got accepted into the Vedic religions:

Commencing with the Panchalas, the Kauravas, the Naimishas (a forest-country to the east of Panchala), the Matsyas, all these, know what religion is. The old men among the Northerners, the Angas, the Magadhas, without themselves knowing what virtue is follow the practices of the Kuru-Panchalas.

The Kurus and the Panchalas comprehend from a half-uttered speech; the Salwas cannot comprehend until the whole speech is uttered. The Magadhas are comprehenders of signs; the Koshalas comprehend from what they see. The Mountaineers, like the Sivis, are very stupid.

The Yavanas are omniscient; the Suras are particularly so. The mlecchas are wedded to the creations of their own fancy that other peoples cannot understand.

The Panchalas observe the duties enjoined in the Vedas; the Kauravas observe truth; the Matsyas and the Surasenas perform sacrifices. Beginning with the Matsyas, the residents of the Kuru and the Panchala countries, the Naimishas as well and the other respectable peoples, the pious among all races are conversant with the eternal truths of religion. The Kauravas with the Panchalas, the Salwas, the Matsyas, the Naimishas, the Koshalas, the Kasapaundras, the Kalingas, the Magadhas, and the Chedis who are all highly blessed, know what the eternal religion is.

Territories and locations within the Panchala Kingdom

Kichaka Kingdom 

Capital: Vetravat

Kichaka the commander-in-chief of Matsya army 

Kichaka Kingdom was a territory lying to the south of (southern) Panchala. It was ruled by Kichaka clan of kings. They belonged to the Suta caste (offspring of Kshatriyas upon Brahmana ladies). One among the Kichakas was the commander-in-chief of the Matsya army under king Virata. Pandava Bhima slew Kichaka because of the latter's abuse towards the wife of Pandavas, viz Draupadi. Kichaka kingdom also lied to the east of the Matsya Kingdom under the rule of king Virata. It seems that this territory was allied to both the Matsyas and Panchalas, with its own independent rulers. Its capital was Vetrakiya, on the banks of river Vetravati (Betwa), also known as Suktimati.

The town named Ekachakra 

It is believed that the Pandavas lived in a small town named Ekachakra, belonging to this territory, during their wanderings after Duryodhana attempted to murder them at Varanavata (a Kuru city).

In the course of their wanderings the Pandavas saw the countries of the Matsyas, the Trigartas, the Panchalas and the Kichakas, and also many beautiful woods and lakes therein. They all had matted locks on their heads and were attired in barks of trees and the skins of animals. They attired in the garbs of ascetics. They used to study the Rik and the other Vedas and also all the Vedangas as well as the sciences of morals and politics. Finally they met Vyasa. He told them:- Not far off before you is a delightful town. Saying this he led them into the town of Ekachakra. on arriving at Ekachakra, the Pandavas lived for a short time in the abode of a Brahmana, leading an eleemosynary life.

During this period, Bhima slew a Rakhsasa named Baka (Vaka), at Vetrakiya controlled the affairs of the Kichaka Kingdom and freed that kingdom from Baka's reign of terror.

Pandavas journey from Ekachakra to Kampilya 

Pandavas proceeded towards Panchala with their mother, to attend the self-choice event of princess Draupadi. In order to reach their destination, they proceeded in a due northerly direction, walking day and night till they reached a sacred shrine of Siva with the crescent mark on his brow. Then those tigers among men, the sons of Pandu, arrived at the banks of the Ganges. It was a forest called Angaraparna. Here, they encountered a Gandharva named Angaraparna. After that encounter they went to a place called Utkochaka, where they met sage Dhaumya. They appointed Dhaumya, the younger brother of Devala, as their priest. Then they proceeded towards the country of the southern Panchalas ruled over by the king Drupada They proceeded by slow stages staying for some time within those beautiful woods and by fine lakes that they beheld along their way and entered the capital of the Panchalas. Beholding the capital (Kampilya), as also the fort, they took up their quarters in the house of a potter. Desirous of beholding the Swayamvara (self-choice ceremony of the princess), the citizens, roaring like the sea, all took their seats on the platforms that were erected around the amphitheatre. The kings from diverse countries entered the grand amphitheatre by the north-eastern gate. And the amphitheatre which itself had been erected on an auspicious and level plain to the north-east of Drupada's capital, was surrounded by beautiful mansions. And it was enclosed on all sides with high walls and a moat with arched doorways here and there. The Pandavas, too, entering that amphitheatre, sat with the Brahmanas and beheld the unequalled affluence of the king of the Panchalas.

"Arjuna won the competition set for winning Draupadi in the self-choice ceremony".<ref>Kisari Mohan Ganguli, The Mahabharata of Krishna-Dwaipayana Vyasa Translated into English Prose", 1883-1896, Bk. 1, Ch. 192.</ref>

 Kanyakubja Kingdom This kingdom is identified to be the modern day Kannauj district of Uttar Pradesh. During the reign of King Drupada of southern Panchala, this territory formed a part of the southern PanchalaGadhi, born in the race of king Kusika and Gadhi's son Viswamitra, were earlier rulers of this kingdom. Gadhi's daughter was married to Richika (could be related to the Rishikas in the north), belonging to the Bhargava clan. Richika's son was Jamadagni and Jamadagni's son was the celebrated Bhargava Rama. Gadhi mentions to Richika about a custom followed by their race, that during marriage, that the bridegroom should give to the bride side a dower of 3000 fleet steeds with brown color. (This custom is similar to that of Madra Culture.) Richika get the horses from Varuna (Varuna is indicative of western cultures. Note that Arjuna also got his excellent chariot, horses and bow from Varuna). The horses reached Kanyakubja capital, crossing the river Ganges. The spot where they crossed the river was known by the name horse's landing place.

Not far from Kanyakubja, a spot in the sacred bank of the Ganges is still famous among men as Aswatirtha in consequence of the appearance of those horses at that place.

Both the Kusikas and the Bhargava-Richikas seems to have links with the ancient western-cultures (See Also: Bahlika Culture, Madra Culture, Rishika Kingdom and Rishikas). Viswamitra (Kusika's race) was born as a Kshatriya and later became a Brahmana, much like what was common in Madra Cultures. Bhargava Rama (Richika's race) was an expert in the use of the battle-axe, which he got from Kailasa region (Kailas range Tibet). The location of the Rishika tribe, who were experts in the use of battle-axes was not too distant from this region. The custom of donating or accepting horses as dowry also indicate north-western culture. It seems that neither the Bhargavas (and Richikas or Rishikas) nor the Kusikas, maintained any distinctions such as Brahmana and Kshatriya upon themselves. However, during the later periods, when the Vedic religion became rigid in its four-order caste-system, the Bhargavas were accepted as Brahmanas and the Kusikas as Kshatriyas.

Gadhi was sovereign whose military force was exceedingly great. Viswamitra also possessed a large army and many animals and vehicles. Using those animals and vehicles he used to roam around in forests in search of deer. During his wanderings he met the sage Vasistha. He engaged in a dispute with this sage, on the matter of the wealth of cattle possessed by the sage. (Cattle wealth always caused dispute among ancient Indian kingdoms (See the dispute between Matsyas and Trigartas for the sake of cattle wealth; in Matsya Kingdom). Viswamitra had to encounter many local-armies to seize the cattle wealth. (See Dravida Kingdom, Kerala Kingdom, Pundra Kingdom and Kirata Kingdom, Himalaya Kingdom). He was vanquished by the local-armies. After the defeat from Vasistha, Viswamitra adopted the life of an ascetic. Bhargava Rama defeated many tribes like Heheyas and later adopting the life of an ascetic. Thus both the Kusikas and Bhargava-Richikas were warrior-tribes, who also were a priest-like class of people.

In the country of Panchala, there is a forest called Utpala, where Viswamitra of Kusika's race had performed sacrifices with his son.

 Pandavas's route from Dwiata lake to Matsya kingdom 

Panchala was one among the countries considered by the Pandavas to spend their 13th year of anonymity along with the kingdoms Chedi, Matsya, Surasena, Pattachchara, Dasarna, Navarashtra, Malla, Salwa, Yugandhara, Saurashtra, Avanti, and the spacious Kuntirashtra.

Pandavas selected the Matsya Kingdom for their 13th year of anonymous life. Pandavas ordered their chief servant Indrasena and the others to take with then the empty chariots and to speedily proceeded to Dwaravati. All the maid-servants of Draupadi were ordered to go to the Panchala kingdom. After that the Pandavas left Dwaita lake in the Dwaita forest and proceeded to Matsya kingdom. Dhaumya, their priest, taking their sacred fires, set out for the Panchala Kingdom. Pandavas travelling eastwards, reached river Yamuna. Travelling along the southern banks of Yamuna, they passed through Yakrilloma, Surasena. Then they turned westwards (possibly to deceive the spies of Duryodhana, who might have following them), leaving behind, on their right (north side), the country of the Panchalas, and on their left (south side), that of the Dasarnas entered the Matsya Kingdom.

 Impact of Magadha kings on Panchala 
Due to the power of Magadha king Jarasandha, many ancient tribes had to shift their domains. Prominent among them were the Yadavas, who fled from Surasena Kingdom to south-west to Anarta Kingdom. The king of the Salwayana tribe with their brethren and followers, and the southern Panchalas and the eastern Kosalas also had to flee to the country of the Kuntis (which was south to these kingdoms).

Even though only king Jarasandha is mentioned, this situation could have arisen due to many generations of powerful Magadha kings who were forefathers of Jarasandha. During the reign of Drupada, no shift in the location of southern Panchala is mentioned explicitly. If the situation was created by Jarasandha alone, and no other Magadha kings later or earlier to him, then this shift of southern-Panchala could be temporary.

 Dispute of Panchalas with Dasarnas There arose a dispute between the Dasarna Kingdom lying to the south, and the southern-Panchala king Drupada, upon the matter of the gender of prince Shikhandi, who was married to the princess of Dasarna. Panchala's alliance with Pandava King Yudhishthira 

Bhima collected tribute for Yudhishthira's Rajasuya sacrifice during his military campaign to the east and first visited the Panchala Kingdom after leaving his home city Indraprastha. only two tribes do not pay tribute unto Yudhishthira, viz., the Panchalas in consequence of their relationship by marriage, and the Andhakas and Vrishnis (Anarta Yadavas) in consequence of their friendship.

When the Pandavas were exiled by Duryodhana, both the Panchalas and Yadavas visited them along with other cousins like the Chedis and Kekeyas. Pandavas five son's by Draupadi, spent some of their life in Panchala and some in Dwaraka during the 13-year-long exile of the Pandavas.

During their pilgrimage all around India, Yudhishthira asked the weak men among his followers to go to king Dhritarashtra of Kuru Kingdom and if he didn't take care of them, then to king Drupada of southern Panchala.

Yudhishthira and his followers, with Matsya king Virata, began to make preparations for war (Kurukshetra War). Virata and his relatives sent word to all the monarchs, and Panchala king Drupada also did the same. And at the request of Pandavas, as also of the two kings of the Matsyas and the Panchalas, many kings gathered for their cause. Druupada sent his priest to Hastinapura for the initial peace talks.

Drupada, the king of the Panchalas, surrounded by his ten heroic sons, Satyajit and other headed by Dhrishtadyumna, and well-protected by Shikhandi, and having furnished his soldiers with necessary things, joined the Pandavas with a full Akshauhini.

 Panchalas in Kurukshetra War 

Panchalas were the closest among all the allies of the Pandavas in the Kurukshetra War. Panchala prince Dhristadyumna was the commander-in-chief for the whole of the Pandava army. Many heroes from Panchala battled in the war. Most of them were alive till the end of the war. However all of them were slain by Ashwathama in an ambush, when they were asleep in their tents, on the last day of the war. Ashwathama was the ruler of half of the Panchala Kingdom viz the northern Panchala, under Kuru king Duryodhana. Northern Panchala was then reduced to the status of a province of the Kuru Kingdom. This could be the political factor that caused the Panchalas (southern Panchalas) to become kinsmen of the Pandavas, who were a rebel force in the Kuru Kingdom. By supporting the Pandavas in Kurukshetra War they might have sought to regain their lost Panchala territories.

 Panchala heroes 

Satyajit was as the commander-in-chief of the Panchala army under king Drupada who fought against Arjuna who was then a disciple of Drona, the preceptor in warfare, in the Kuru Kingdom. He came to the Kurukshetra War leading the one Akshouhini of Panchala army. The brave warriors among the Panchalas, viz., Jayanta, Amitaujas and the great car-warrior Satyajit were great car-warriors (Maharathas) by Bhishma. He was slain by Drona on the 12th day of the war.

The Panchala princes Yudhamanyu and Uttamaujas. were protectors of Arjuna's car-wheels during the battle. Similarly the Panchala prince Kumara was one of the protectors of Yudhishthira's car-wheels, along with another hero Yugadhara (hailing from the city of Yugandhara, located somewhere to the west of Kurujangala (either in Haryana or Punjab). Kumara and Yugandhara were slain by Drona. Vyaghradatta was another Panchala prince slain by Drona along with Sinhasena.

Dhrishtadyumna, Shikhandi, Janamejaya (the son of Durmuksha), Chandrasen, Madrasen, Kritavarman, Dhruva, Dhara, Vasuchandra and Sutejana were Panchala heroes, some of them being the sons of Drupada. The 10 sons of Drupada. and five sons (something off here) as in the Kurukshetra War. Suratha and Satrunjaya were sons of Drupada slain by Ashwathama. Vrika and Panchalya were sons of Drupada slain by Drona. Drupada's three grandsons also were in the war. Shikhandi's son Khsatradeva was in the war. Dhristadyumna's sons, tender in year, were slain by Drona in the war. Other Panchala Chiefs who died at the hands of Drona were Ketama and Vasudhana as per C.Rajagopalachari's Mahabharata.

Valanika, Jayanika, Jaya, Prishdhra, and Chandrasena—these heroes were also believed to be of Panchala, slain by Ashwathama.

 The Somakas, Srinjayas and the Prabhadrakas 

These three names were frequently in the story of the Kurukshetra War either as related to the Panchalas or as synonymous to the Panchalas. Srinjayas and Somakas were tribes allied to the Panchalas by kinship, born off from the various branches of the same royal lineage that brought forth the Panchala-tribe. They dwelled in the various provinces of the Panchala kingdom. Prabhadrakas seems to be an elite group of Panchala army, employed in Kurukshetra War.

 The Somakas 

Somaka seems to be a name used to denote all the tribes of Panchalas. The word Somaka, means the one who belonged to the Lunar Dynasty. This name could have given by rulers of Solar Dynasty. The Kosala Kingdom ruled by Solar Dynasty of kings lied to the east of Panchala. So this name could have coined by the Kosalas to denote the Panchalas. Thus the name could be collective to the whole of the Panchala tribes and specific to the tribes that lie close to Kosala, i.e. the tribes that dwell in the eastern parts of Panchala.

Pancalas and Srinjayas were sometimes referred to collectively as Somakas.
Somakas and Panchalas were different tribes.
Somakas and Srinjayas were different tribes.
Somakas and Prabhadrakas were different tribes.
The Srinjayas and the Panchalas, the Matsyas and the Somakas were separate tribes.
Drona during the war said to Duryodhana:

I will not put off my armour without slaying all the Panchalas. O king, go and tell my son Ashwathama not let the Somakas alone.

Kshatradharman, a Kurukshetra War hero, belonged to the Somaka tribe; another hero was Uttamaujas belonging to the Panchala tribe.

King Somaka, (1-2,127,128) is with his son Jantu. King Somaka was the son of Sahadeva, and a most excellent maker of gifts and he performed a sacrifice on the banks of Yamuna. King Somaka is listed among the great kings of ancient India.

The Somakas and Panchalas were at many of the same places. Drupada was the Somaka king and Dhristadyumna is a Somaka prince.

 The Srinjayas 

Srinjaya king Hotravahana is the maternal grandfather of the Kasi princess Amba (Amva). Amva, coming from Salwa stayed in the asylum of sage Saikhavatya (who dwelled on the banks of Saikavati river). Hotravahana met her granddaughter there. He was a friend of Bhargava Rama.

The Panchalas and Srinjayas attacked Arjuna when he tried to make Drupada captive for the sake of Drona.

Uttamujas was the great Srinjaya car-warrior.

The Srinjayas and Panchalas were separate tribes at many places.
Chedis the Andhakas, the Vrishnis, the Bhojas, the Kukuras and the Srinjayas were separate tribes. Here the Andhakas, Vrishinis, Bhojas and the Kukuras were tribes belonging to the Yadava clan.
The Kasayas (Kasis), the Chedis, the Matsyas, the Srinjayas, the Panchalas, and the Prabhadrakas were separate tribes.
The Chedis, the Srinjayas, the Kasis and the Kosalas were battling together for Pandavas.

A Srinjaya king is mentioned as great amongst conquerors at (1- 1). He is also mentioned at (2,8). At (7,53) Srinjaya is mentioned as the son of a king named Switya. Sinjaya's son named Suvarnashthivin was slain by some robber-tribes during his childhood. The sages Narada and Parvata (Narada's sister's son (12,30)) were Srinjaya's friends. Chapters (7- 53 to 69) describes a narration of Narada to Srinjaya, to console him in the death of his son. This is also mentioned at (12-29,30,31).
Bhishma mentions at (5,164) that he could slay the whole armies of Srinjayas and the Salweyas (Salwa lied to the west of Kuru while Panchala lied to its east).

Srinjayas were mentioned as synonymous to Panchalas at many places. Refer (3- 33,35), (5- 22, 24, 25, 26, 28, 48, 71, 72, 82, 93, 127, 162, 163, 168), (6- 16, 45, 59, 60, 72, 73, 74, 75, 87, 91, 99, 108, 109, 110, 115, 116, 120), (7- 2, 7, 9, 12, 13, 14, 16, 33, 76, 92, 94, 107, 122, 148, 151, 152, 180, 184, 190), (8- 21, 24, 31, 35, 51, 54, 56, 57, 58, 59, 61, 66, 67, 73, 75, 79, 85, 93, 94), (9- 19, 29, 33, 34, 57, 59, 61), (10,8), (11,26).King Srinjaya is mentioned as an ally of King Jayadratha of Sindhu. (3,263).

 The Prabhadrakas Prabhadrakas seems to be an elite army obtained by Panchalas from the Kambojas. They could also be a Panchala army-unit or a Panchala tribe, that got trained in cavalry warfare by the Kambojas.

At (7,23.42-43) the Prabhadrakas were mentioned as hailing from Kamboja Kingdom. In MBH verse 7.23.43, as it can be seen from original Sanskrit text, the term Prabhadraka has been used as a qualifier before the Kambojas:
 (MBH Gorakhpore Rec., 7.23.42-44)

Hence in this context, the term Prabhadraka definitely implies adjective and not noun, and may not, therefore, be confused with the Prabhadraka clan. As an adjective, the term Prabhadraka/Prabhadrakastu means "exceedingly handsome, exceedingly fortunate" Researchers like Dr Robert Shafer, Dr J. L. Kamboj, S Kirpal Singh etc. have, therefore correctly taken the term Prabhadraka in the sense of an adjective rather than noun in the present context and qualify Kambojas as "very handsome, very fortunate". Ganguli's translation is in error here. In fact, according to Sanskrit scholars, Ganguli's translation of Mahabharata has numerous translations errors. (See also note 4 & 5 in: Parama Kamboja Kingdom). They could be the army bought by Panchals from the Kambojas, since Kambojas were famous for lending their horses or cavalry to any party on payment basis:- The Prabhadrakas of the Kamvoja country, numbering 6000, with upraised weapons, with excellent steeds on their gold-decked cars, with stretched bows, supported Dhristadyumna (6, 19), (7,23). To distinguish them from the proper Panchala army or from other Prabhadrakas, they were mentioned as Prabhadraka-Panchalas (7,151). They were 6000 in numbers and mentioned as supporting Shikhandi at (7,151). They were an elite group in the Pandava army (5- 48, 199). This army is mentioned as allies of the Pandavas at (6,112), (7- 159, 182), (8- 12, 22, 30, 48, 49, 56, 67), (9- 7, 11, 15, 27). Karna slew 770 foremost of warriors among the Prabhadrakas initially (8,48). He then slew 1700 of them (8, 67).

A group of Prabhadrakas is mentioned as battling against Dhristadyumna at (7,92):- The chief of the Avanti Kingdom (Mahabharata), with the Sauviras and the cruel Prabhadrakas, resisted wrathful Dhrishtadyumna.

The Kasayas (Kasis), the Chedis, the Matsyas, the Srinjayas, the Panchalas, and the Prabhadrakas were mentioned as separate armies. Prabhadrakas and Panchalas were mentioned as separate armies.

When Ashwathama attacked the Panchalas in a night-time ambush, Shikhandi woke up, alarmed the Prabhadrakas and they tried to put up some resistance but all were slain.

 Other references 

Brahmadatta is mentioned as a highly devout king of Panchala Here he is mentioned as donating a conch-shell.(?) He is mentioned as donating two precious jewels called Nidhi and Sankha and he is also mentioned
A sage from Panchala is mentioned as Rishi-Panchala (also known as Galava, born in the Vabhravya race) He compiled the rules in respect of the division of syllables and words for reading the Vedas and those about emphasis and accent in utterance, and shone as the first scholar who became conversant with those two subjects. He is mentioned to have acquired the science of Krama.

 See also 
Epic India

References

Kisari Mohan Ganguli, The Mahabharata of Krishna-Dwaipayana Vyasa Translated into English Prose'', 1883-1896.

External links

Kingdoms of the Puru clan